The Allen–West House is an historic house at 153 George Street in Barrington, Rhode Island.  The main block of the two story timber-frame house was built  by Joseph Allen, a housewright.  It is one of the older houses in Barrington, hearkening to the days when it was still part of Swansea, Massachusetts, and is a well-preserved rare example of a vernacular square house plan.  The house stands amid grounds that were farmed from the 17th to the 20th centuries by the owners of this house, who included members of the Allen family until the mid-19th century, and the Wests until the mid-20th.  The house has had two major additions: a kitchen ell added to the east in the 19th century and extended in the 1950s, and a  single-story enclosed porch on the west side.

The house was listed on the National Register of Historic Places in 2013.

See also
 National Register of Historic Places listings in Bristol County, Rhode Island

References

Buildings and structures in Barrington, Rhode Island
Houses in Bristol County, Rhode Island
Houses on the National Register of Historic Places in Rhode Island
National Register of Historic Places in Bristol County, Rhode Island